Chen Kun-hou (born 25 July 1939 in Taichū, Japanese Formosa) is a Taiwanese film director and cinematographer. He is known for his film Growing Up (1983), one of the films that initiated the Taiwan New Cinema movement. Chen was also the cinematographer for several of fellow director Hou Hsiao-hsien's earlier films.

Selected filmography
 My Favorite Season (1985)
 Osmanthus Alley (1987)
 My Mother's Teahouse (1988)
The Triangle Land (2012)

References

External links

1939 births
Living people
Taiwanese film directors
Taiwanese cinematographers